Singles Breaking Up (Vol. 1) is a compilation album by American math rock band Don Caballero. Singles Breaking Up (Vol. 1) was released on Touch and Go Records in 1999 and collects songs from five of the band's seven-inch singles, one song from a "various artists" compilation and one previously unreleased song.

Background 
The title is a reference to The Buzzcocks' compilation album Singles Going Steady.

The collection would later be issued on vinyl for the first time on October 20, 2017. Despite as the name suggests, there is no Singles Breaking Up (Vol. 2).

Track listing

Reception 
Pitchfork gave the album a 7.2 out of 10.

Personnel
Band members are not named on the packaging and the album is credited simply to 'Don Caballero.'

Don Caballero
Damon Che – drums 
Ian Williams – guitar (tracks 7-13)
Pat Morris – bass guitar (tracks 1-9, 12-13)
Mike Banfield – guitar (tracks 1-10, 12-13)
George Draguns – bass guitar (track 10)
Matt Jencik – bass guitar (track 11)

Technical 
Lee Hollihan – engineer (tracks 1-6)
Steve Albini – engineer, producer (tracks 7-9, 12-13) (uncredited)
Bob Weston – engineer (track 10)
Al Sutton – producer (song 11)

References

External links
Singles Breaking Up (Vol. 1) on Touch and Go Records

Don Caballero albums
1999 compilation albums
albums produced by Steve Albini
Touch and Go Records compilation albums